The Pittsburgh Industrial Railroad  was a Class III short-line railroad operating about 42 miles of track over the Chartiers Branch in southwest Pennsylvania. It was owned by RailTex, which bought the line from Conrail in 1996. In 2000, after the purchase of RailTex by RailAmerica, the railroad was sold to the Ohio Central Railroad System and renamed the Pittsburgh and Ohio Central Railroad. It is owned by Genesee & Wyoming.

Interchanges
McKees Rocks
Pittsburgh, Allegheny & McKees Rocks Railroad (PAM)
CSX
Duff Junction
Norfolk Southern

Roster
 2342 sold to Pittsburgh and Ohio Central Railroad.

References
 Hobo's Guide to the Pennsy:Chartiers Branch
 Western Pennsylvanian Railroads:Pittsburgh & Ohio Central Railroad

Defunct Pennsylvania railroads
RailAmerica
Spin-offs of Conrail